Eszter Juhász (born 23 February 1988 in Hungary) is a Finnish curler.

She started curling in 2006 at the age of 18.

Eszter Juhász was born in Hungary. Her family moved to Finland when Juhász was at the age of 2.

Teams

Women's

Mixed

Mixed doubles

References

External links

Living people
1988 births
Finnish female curlers
Finnish curling champions
Finnish people of Hungarian descent
Hungarian emigrants to Finland